Yevhen Valeriyovych Vynohradov (born 30 April 1984 in Vasylkiv) is a Ukrainian hammer thrower. He was born in the Kyiv Oblast, in the Ukrainian republic of the Soviet Union. His personal best throw is 80.58 metres, achieved in July 2008 in Kyiv.

He finished seventh at the 2003 European Junior Championships. He also competed at the 2007 World Championships and the 2008 Olympic Games without reaching the final.

Doping ban
Vynohradov tested positive for the anabolic steroid nandrolone in an out-of-competition control 7 July 2009 and was subsequently handed a two-year ban from sport. The ban ended 7 September 2011.

Achievements

References

sports-reference

Athletes (track and field) at the 2008 Summer Olympics
Doping cases in athletics
Living people
Olympic athletes of Ukraine
Ukrainian male hammer throwers
Ukrainian sportspeople in doping cases
World Athletics Championships athletes for Ukraine
1984 births
Athletes (track and field) at the 2016 Summer Olympics
People from Vasylkiv
Sportspeople from Kyiv Oblast